Sinsa station is a station on the Seoul Subway Line 3 and the Shinbundang Line. It is located in Sinsa-dong, Gangnam-gu and Seocho-gu, Seoul.  It will serve as the northern terminus of the Wirye–Sinsa Line when it is opened in 2025.

Surrounding 
There are national pension management corporations such as Gangnam branch office, Sinsa-dong resident center, Apgujeong district, Yeongdong market, Hadong park, Korea Basketball Federation, and Hannam Grand Bridge.

Station layout

Ridership

References

Seoul Metropolitan Subway stations
Railway stations in South Korea opened in 1985
Metro stations in Gangnam District
Metro stations in Seocho District
Seoul Subway Line 3